Senator Schmitz may refer to:

Becky Schmitz (fl. 2000s–2010s), Iowa State Senate
John G. Schmitz (1930–2001), California State Senate

See also
Senator Schmidt (disambiguation)
Senator Schmitt (disambiguation)